Dreams to Reality is a 1997 third-person action-adventure game developed and published by Cryo Interactive. It was ported to the PlayStation under the title Dreams.

Gameplay and plot 
From a third-person perspective, the player navigates the game world, gathering magic powers and weapons and finding friends. Movement options include walking, flying and swimming.

Players assume the role of protagonist Duncan, and explore surreal dream worlds while attempting to stop an evil group that seeks to control subconscious reality.

Development
While working on the game, producer/designer Olivier Denes commented, "The team is all gamers, but we're all different gamers, so in Dreams, you can do as you wish. I watched a woman play and she said, 'How wonderful, you can fly.' A man usually likes to pick a gun and shoot everything. We try to let people do things the way they like."

Reception
While they praised the game's graphics, PC Gamer UK called the game "an unsatisfying mix of twee adventure, half-baked action" and platformer-style "running, jumping and dodging", and awarded it a score of 65/100. Meristation thought the game was highly polished, memorable, and would appeal to fans of the genre. Game.EXE gave the game a rating of 77%. Level 06 gave it a rating of 8/10. PC Powerplay deemed an "absolute stinker". Gambler Magazine gave it 65%. PC Games gave it a C.

References

External links
 

1997 video games
Action-adventure games
Cryo Interactive games
Europe-exclusive video games
PlayStation (console) games
Video games about dreams
Video games developed in France
Windows games